Adriaan Johannes Badenhorst  (born 18 July 1978) is a South African former rugby union player.

Playing career
Badenhorst matriculated in Prieska and in 1997 enrolled at Stellenbosch University. He played for the university's under 19 and under 20 teams and in 1997 was selected for the  senior team. He was a member of the Western Province team that won the Currie Cup in 2000.

Badenhorst toured with the Springboks to Argentina, Britain and Ireland in 2000 and played in one tour match. In 2001 Badenhorst toured with the South Africa 'A' team to Europe.

See also
List of South Africa national rugby union players – Springbok no. 712

References

1978 births
Living people
South African rugby union players
South Africa international rugby union players
Western Province (rugby union) players
Stormers players
Stellenbosch University alumni
People from Siyathemba Local Municipality
Rugby union players from the Northern Cape
Rugby union locks